Wagner Maniçoba de Moura (born 27 June 1976) is a Brazilian actor, director, filmmaker, musician, and journalist. Wagner started his career doing theater in Salvador, where he worked with renowned directors, and soon scored some appearances in films. In 2003, he got his first leading roles in movies, in addition to having a prominent role in Carandiru, which propelled him to the main scene of Brazilian cinema. He continued starring in national feature films, including the box office hits Elite Squad and Elite Squad 2, playing the famous character Capitão Nascimento. The first film received the Golden Bear award and both productions reverberated outside Brazil, which boosted the actor's international recognition.

In 2007, he was the antagonist of the telenovela Paraíso Tropical, being praised for his performance by both the public and the critics.

In 2013, he was cast in the American science fiction feature film Elysium, opposite Matt Damon and Jodie Foster The film marked the international debut of the Brazilian actor, who received praise from critics for this work. In 2015, he went on to star in the series Narcos, playing drug trafficker Pablo Escobar, a role for which he was nominated for several awards, including the Golden Globe. Later, Moura came back as a director for two episodes of Narcos: Mexico.

Besides being a well-established and acclaimed actor in Brazil, Moura achieved a consolidated international career and it is part of the movement that seeks positive representation for Latin Americans in Hollywood.

In 2021, he made his debut as a movie director and screenwriter  with Marighella, a biopic about Carlos Marighella, which hit cinemas after a well received debut on Berlin Film Festival in 2019. The movie won several awards, included best picture, best director and best adapted screenplay for Moura in different ceremonies.

Early life 
Moura was born in Salvador and raised in Rodelas, 540 km from the capital. José Moura, his father, was in the military, so the family, still consisting of his mother, Alderiva, and his younger sister Lediane - who works as a pediatrician - got used to moving around. His relationship with acting started thanks to a schoolmate that, just like him, was passionate for the arts. His colleague did theater and Wagner wanted to follow the same steps to try to find a class that would fit in.

He became best friends with Emmy nominee actor Lazaro Ramos during teenage times in Bahia. Ramos reported that his friend was a great supporter of his career since youth.

Career

Early career in theatre and Brazilian cinema (1996–2005) 
Moura joined acting classes during his teens, and started working in professional theater in 1996. Later, he graduated in journalist at the Federal University of Bahia. He had a small PR company that worked for other local actors and theaters company but the business soon went bankrupt. In the early 2000s, he was a reporter for an interview program on TV Bahia – an affiliate of Rede Globo – and covered high society parties talking to businessmen and celebrities.

Despite that, Moura continued making auditions to chase his acting aspirations. Success in the career came with the play A Máquina. Critical and public acclaim, the show leaved Bahia for presentations in Pernambuco, São Paulo and Rio de Janeiro in seasons of great success. The hit boosted the careers of Moura and his colleagues, now-successful Brazilian actors Lázaro Ramos and Vladimir Brichta.

In cinema, he started with the shorts Pop Killer, by Victor Mascarenhas, and Rádio Gogó, by José Araripe Jr. His first feature was Woman on Top, by the Venezuelan director Fina Torres, in which he had a small participation with Ramos, whom he helped with the tests in English, since Ramos did not speak the language.

With the resumption of Brazilian cinema opening up to new faces, he got roles in several productions with important names, such as Behind the Sun, by Walter Salles; The Three Marias, by Aluizio Abranches; God Is Brazilian, by Cacá Diegues; Nina, by Heitor Dhalia; The Man of the Year, by José Henrique Fonseca; The Middle of the World, by Vicente Amorim. In Recife, during the filming of God Is Brazilian, Moura was reading the book Carandiru Station by Drauzio Varella when he found out about the auditions for the film Carandiru. Because he was busy with the recordings and unable to appear in the face-to-face auditions in another state, he asked the person in charge of the making of to help him record a tape that would be sent to the production. The material was very dark, and it was only possible to hear the actor reading excerpts from the book. Some time later Héctor Babenco would call him for a meeting in São Paulo, curious to meet the owner of the voice. The actor ended up joining the cast as the prisoner, dealer and drug addict Zico.

He debuted on television after famous Brazilian actor and Mouras's costar in God Is Brazilian, Antônio Fagundes invite him for a small participation in the popular series Carga Pesada on Rede Globo. Then came the series Sexo Frágil, which entered the network's Friday night schedule after its success as a sketch on the TV show Fantástico.

The play Dilúvio em Tempos de Seca was shown in Rio de Janeiro, São Paulo and ended its season at the Curitiba Theater Festival at Teatro Guaíra for an audience of more than four thousand people in the two days it was presented. With the end of the work, the actor would turn to television and cinema.

He debuted in telenovelas at A Lua Me Disse by Miguel Falabella, starring the heartthrob Gustavo, a contrast with the other characters he has played so far. He then amended the telenovela with the limited series JK, the biography of the Brazil's former president Juscelino Kubitschek, playing the title character in his youth.

Elite Squad, TV, theater and music (2007–2012) 
In 2007, he was scheduled to play businessman Olavo Novaes, villain of the telenovela Paraíso Tropical, wrote by prestigious Brazilian screenwriters Gilberto Braga and Ricardo Linhares. Braga initially thought about having Selton Mello on the role, who turned it down due to scheduling conflicts, and director Dennis Carvalho, who had worked with Moura on JK, nominated him for the role. Olavo and his lover, prostitute Bebel, played by Camila Pitanga, became the bigest highlights of the show. It was the duo of actor's idea to intensify the affection relationship between two characters, as it seemed interesting for the plot. The result was a popular appeal for the villains to become officially a couple and have more screen time together, which happened. Both Moura and Pitanga were acclaimed and highly awarded for their roles.

At the same time, the film Elite Squad, in which he played the role of police officer Captain Nascimento, began to have wide repercussions. The film initially would have the aspiring Mathias as the protagonist of the film, but during editing it was realized that showing Nascimento's point of view would set the tone and energy that the production was looking for. From there, the synopsis was changed, the production was reassembled and Moura had to hastily record the narration. The film broke all box office records, won awards in Brazil and Europe, including the Berlin's Golden Bear, and generated controversy and debates about piracy, police harassment and urban violence.

With both works, he became one of the most popular actors in his country, immensely recognized by the public and critics as one of the great names of his generation of actors and chosen by Vogue Brazil as "Man of the Year" in 2007.

In 2008, after the end of the telenovela, he returned to the theater after years without stepping on stage, with the play Hamlet by William Shakespeare - which in the words of the actor, was an old dream for being his favorite play since adolescence - in the role of protagonist and producer. The theatrical process was recorded by his wife, Sandra, and became a documentary. Hamlet was also a success with the public and acclaimed by the specialized press.

He was in three more short films: Desejo, Ópera do Mallandro and Blackout, awarded at the Festival de Gramado; in the films Ó Paí, Ó, Saneamento Básico, A Máquina and Romance. In addition, he resumed the band he formed in 1992 with friends, Sua Mãe, performed on some TV programs and released a CD.

In 2010, he came back as Nascimento, in the sequel to Elite Squad. Elite Squad: The Enemy Within repeated the success of the first version and for ten years held the highest-grossing title in the country's history.

In 2012, he was the guest vocalist for the "MTV live tribute to Legião Urbana" held in São Paulo and broadcast live by MTV Brasil itself. Wagner Moura didn't hide his satisfaction, as he stated in several interviews that he was a big fan of the band.

In 2011 he was honored at the Braskem Theater Award, and in 2013 at the Gramado Festival.

Also in 2013, he was elected Man of the Year by GQ Brazil in the cinema category.

Start in Hollywood and debut as a director (2013–present) 
The film Elysium marked his Hollywood debut, alongside Matt Damon, Jodie Foster and Alice Braga (who was nominated by Moura for the film), playing Spider. Moura got the role after his agents show his work in Elite Squad 2 for the movie producers 

In 2014, he stars in Futuro Beach by Karim Aïnouz, once again at the Berlin International Film Festival, as a lifeguard from Recife who goes to Germany after falling in love with a tourist. The film received homophobic reactions from part of the audiences for its depiction of a romance between two men, which included nudity and sex scenes. In the same year, Rio, I Love You was released, in which Moura plays a parachutist who talks about Christ the Redeemer in the short film by José Padilha.

As a director, he worked on the music video for the song "Te Amo" from the album Bicicletas, Bolos e Outras Alegrias, by singer Vanessa da Mata.

In April 2015, Moura was confirmed to play one of the "seven men" in the movie The Magnificent Seven, a remake of the 1960 Western classic alongside names like Denzel Washington, Chris Pratt, Ethan Hawke, Vincent D'Onofrio, Haley Bennett and Luke Grimes, scheduled to premiere in 2017, but had to decline the invitation due to filming the series Narcos, in which he was the protagonist. For the same reason, he could not star in the Brazilian feature Bingo: The King of the Mornings.

In August of the same year, Narcos debuted on Netflix, with Moura playing Pablo Escobar. The performance was praised by critics and the series was very well accepted by the public. Narcos earned him a Golden Globe nomination for best actor in a TV series in 2016, becoming the first Brazilian in 14 years to achieve recognition.

In 2018 he was announced in the new production of Brian De Palma, but the project was paused. In September 2019, he released the film Wasp Network, also from Netflix and directed by Olivier Assayas, in competition at the Venice Film Festival.

In 2020, he signed with WME and was part of the official jury of the Sundance Film Festival, voting in the international fiction category. Also at Sundance, he launched the Netflix drama Sergio, about Brazilian diplomat Sérgio Vieira de Mello, in which he is both the protagonist and producer.

In 2021, he joined the Academy of Motion Picture Arts and Sciences in Hollywood.

In November of the same year, the third season of Narcos: Mexico was released, in which he directs two episodes. In the same period, he managed to release his first film as a director, Marighella, in Brazilian cinemas. Marighella officially premiered in 2019 at the Berlin International Film Festival within the official out-of-competition show, and received good reviews. At the Grande Prêmio do Cinema Brasileiro 2022 (Brazilian Film Grand Prix), the film was the biggest champion with eight awards, including Best Film, Best First Director and Best Adapted Screenplay for Moura

During interviews, he announced that he signed a contract with Disney+ to produce a series about Maria Bonita, and will be in the next productions by Kleber Mendonça Filho and Karim Aïnouz. in addition, he will be in the animation Arca de Noé by Sergio Machado and Walter Salles, inspired by Tom Jobim and Vinicius de Moraes.

In 2022, he starred in the Apple TV+ series Shining Girls with Elisabeth Moss, in the role of journalist Dan Velásquez, joined the cast of Civil War, a film by Oscar-nominated director and screenwriter Alex Garland with production by A24, and starred in Puss in Boots: The Last Wish, with Antonio Banderas, Salma Hayek, Olivia Colman and Florence Pugh, voicing the wolf who is revealed to be the physical incarnation of Death. He starred, alongside Ryan Gosling, Chris Evans, Ana de Armas, Regé-Jean Page, Billy Bob Thornton and others in the feature The Gray Man, considered the most expensive in the history of Netflix, as the eccentric Laszlo Sosa. In the role, Moura lost twenty kilos and was praised by the Russo brothers, who called him "an incredible actor, one of the most talented in the world".

Later, it was announced on the Amazon Prime Video series Mr and Mrs Smith.

Personal life

Of Italian, Portuguese and Spanish origin, Moura's native language is Portuguese, but he also fluently speaks English and Spanish. For his portrayal of Pablo Escobar in Narcos, Moura took Spanish lessons, to sound more like a native speaker. Moura had to gain over 18 kilograms (40 pounds) to play the role of Pablo Escobar; after production of the second season of Narcos, Moura decided to lose the weight through an all-vegan diet.

Moura practices Transcendental Meditation, Muay Thai and Brazilian Jiu-Jitsu.

He has three children, Bem, Salvador and José, all born in Rio de Janeiro, with journalist and photographer Sandra Delgado. Moura and Delgado met at the university but only got involved after they graduated. At the time, he was moving to Rio and invited her to go with. She accepted, despite very recent dating. The two never formally married. The family has residences in Salvador, Los Angeles and Rio de Janeiro, and the actor claims that they live where the work is, having spent time in Colombia for Narcos and now most of the time in Los Angeles. Despite this, he considers Bahia his real home.

Filmography

Film

Television

Theater

Awards and nominations

Television

Film

Theater

References

External links

1976 births
Living people
20th-century Brazilian male actors
21st-century Brazilian male actors
Brazilian male film actors
Brazilian male stage actors
Brazilian male television actors
People from Salvador, Bahia